A statue of Mahatma Gandhi was installed at the University of Ghana in Accra, Ghana, until being relocated in 2018.

See also
 List of artistic depictions of Mahatma Gandhi

References

Buildings and structures in Accra
Outdoor sculptures
Relocated buildings and structures
Accra
University of Ghana